The shower-curtain effect in physics describes the phenomenon of a shower curtain being blown inward when a shower is running. The problem of identifying the cause of this effect has been featured in Scientific American magazine, with several theories given to explain the phenomenon but no definite conclusion.

The shower-curtain effect may also be used to describe the observation how nearby phase front distortions of an optical wave are more severe than remote distortions of the same amplitude.

Hypotheses

Buoyancy hypothesis 

Also called Chimney effect or Stack effect, observes that warm air (from the hot shower) rises out over the shower curtain as cooler air (near the floor) pushes in under the curtain to replace the rising air.  By pushing the curtain in towards the shower, the (short range) vortex and Coandă effects become more significant. However, the shower-curtain effect persists when cold water is used, implying that this cannot be the only mechanism at work.

Bernoulli effect hypothesis 
The most popular explanation given for the shower-curtain effect is Bernoulli's principle.  Bernoulli's principle states that an increase in velocity results in a decrease in pressure.  This theory presumes that the water flowing out of a shower head causes the air through which the water moves to start flowing in the same direction as the water.  This movement would be parallel to the plane of the shower curtain.  If air is moving across the inside surface of the shower curtain, Bernoulli's principle says the air pressure there will drop.  This would result in a pressure differential between the inside and outside, causing the curtain to move inward.  It would be strongest when the gap between the bather and the curtain is smallest, resulting in the curtain attaching to the bather.

Horizontal vortex hypothesis 
A computer simulation of a typical bathroom found that none of the above theories pan out in their analysis, but instead found that the spray from the shower-head drives a horizontal vortex. This vortex has a low-pressure zone in the centre, which sucks the curtain.

David Schmidt of the University of Massachusetts was awarded the 2001 Ig Nobel Prize in Physics for his partial solution to the question of why shower curtains billow inwards. He used a computational fluid dynamics code to achieve the results.  Professor Schmidt is adamant that this was done "for fun" in his own free time without the use of grants.

Coandă effect
The Coandă effect, also known as "boundary layer attachment", is the tendency of a moving fluid to adhere to an adjacent wall.

Condensation
A hot shower will produce steam that condenses on the shower side of the curtain, lowering the pressure there.  In a steady state the steam will be replaced by new steam delivered by the shower but in reality the water temperature will fluctuate and lead to times when the net steam production is negative.

Air pressure
Colder dense air outside and hot less dense air inside causes higher air pressure on the outside to force the shower curtain inwards to equalise the air pressure, this can be observed simply when the bathroom door is open allowing cold air into the bathroom.

Solutions

Many shower curtains come with features to reduce the shower-curtain effect. They may have adhesive suction cups on the bottom edges of the curtain, which are then pushed onto the sides of the shower when in use. Others may have magnets at the bottom, though these are not effective on acrylic or fiberglass tubs.

It is possible to use a telescopic shower curtain rod to block the curtain on its lower part and to prevent it from sucking inside.

Hanging the curtain rod higher or lower, or especially further away from the shower head, can reduce the effect. A (convex) curved shower rod can also be used to hold the curtain against the inside wall of a tub.

A weight can be attached to a long string and the string attached to the curtain rod in the middle of the curtain (on the inside). Hanging the weight low against the curtain just above the rim of the shower pan or tub makes it an effective billowing deterrent without allowing the weight to hit the pan or tub and damage it.

There are a few alternative solutions that either attach to the shower curtain directly, attach to the shower rod or attach to the wall.

References

External links
 Scientific American: Why does the shower curtain move toward the water?
 Why does the shower curtain blow up and in instead of down and out?
 Video demonstration of how this phenomenon could be solved.
 The Straight Dope: Why does the shower curtain blow in despite the water pushing it out (revisited)?
 2001 Ig Nobel Prize Winners
 Fluent NEWS: Shower Curtain Grabs Scientist – But He Lives to Tell Why
 Arggh, Why Does the Shower Curtain Attack Me? by Joe Palca. All Things Considered, National Public Radio.  November 4, 2006. (audio)
 Experimental Investigation of the Influence of the Relative Position of the Scattering Layer on Image Quality: the Shower Curtain Effect
 The shower curtain effect; ESA 

Fluid dynamics
Physical phenomena
Unsolved problems in physics
Bathing